Laakkonen is a Finnish surname. Notable people with the surname include:

 Kaija Saariaho (born 1952), née Laakkonen, Finnish actress
 Risto Laakkonen (born 1967), Finnish ski jumper
 Sami Laakkonen (born 1974), Finnish bandy player
 Janne Laakkonen (born 1982), Finnish professional ice hockey player
 Saila Laakkonen, Finnish actress

Finnish-language surnames